Lontong dekem is one of the specialties of Indonesia. Lontong dekem is also called dekem rice cake. Dekem rice cake originated from Pemalang Regency. The process involves soaking the rice cake in water until it is submerged hence the name "dekem" meaning "immersion" in Pemalang district.

The ingredients of lontong dekem consist of sliced rice cake, yellow watery gravy and fried onion, serundeng, and crackers. Dekem rice cake is also served with duck meat mixture. Dekem common rice cake is served with chicken satay. There are two variants of satay chicken; fried and stewed satay sauce.

References

Indonesian cuisine
National dishes